Demetrio e Polibio (Demetrius and Polybius) is a two-act operatic dramma serio by Gioachino Rossini to a libretto by Vincenzina Viganò-Mombelli. The opera was orchestrated for flute, oboes, clarinets, basson, horns, trumpets, and strings.

Demetrio e Polibio was Rossini's first attempt at a full-scale opera, "assembled piecemeal" during his student days at the Philharmonic Academy of Bologna in 1806. Because it was commissioned by tenor Domenico Mombelli (whose wife wrote the libretto) and was performed privately by Mombelli and his two daughters, a performance which Rossini did not attend, it was not his first fully staged opera.

The opera was not professionally staged until 18 May 1812, when it premiered at Rome's Teatro Valle.

Roles

Synopsis
Time: 2nd Century, B.C.
Place: Parthia

Act 1
The good Polybius, King of Parthia, is the protector of both his own daughter Lisinga and her lover Siveno. Everyone believes Siveno to be the son of Minteus, a minister of King Demetrius of Syria, but he is actually the long estranged son of Demetrius. Demetrius, holding Minteus responsible for his son's disappearance, arrives at the court of Parthia in the guise of Eumeno, a royal messenger, and demands that Siveno be turned over to Syria. Polybius refuses. Siveno and Lisinga celebrate their marriage. Polybius confides to Siveno that he is worried about what has happened, but Siveno reassures him. Meanwhile, Eumene (Demetrius) plots to kidnap Siveno and bring him back to Syria. He bribes the servants and guards and at night manages to enter the Parthian court. However, when he arrives in the bed-chamber of the young couple, he finds Lisinga alone and kidnaps her instead. Polybius and Siveno try in vain to stop him.

Act 2
Polybius and Siveno plead for Lisinga's release. In reply, Euemeno (Demetrius) threatens to kill her unless Siveno is turned over to him. In turn, Polybius threatens to kill Siveno unless Lisinga is released. The situation starts to resolve when Eumene (Demetrius), looks at an old medallion and realizes that Siveno is actually his lost son. Meanwhile, Polybius does not want to lose Lisinga, and Eumene (Demetrius) only wants Siveno. Desperate at their impending separation, Lisinga tries to kill Eumene, but he finally reveals his true identity as King Demetrius and announces that Siveno is his son. Peace is restored, and the couple live happily ever after.

Recordings

References
Notes

Cited sources
Gossett, Philip; Brauner, Patricia (2001), "Demetrio e Polibio" in Holden, Amanda (ed.), The New Penguin Opera Guide, New York: Penguin Putnam. 
Kennedy, Michael (2007), "Demetrio e Polibio", The Concise Oxford Dictionary of Music. (By subscription:Oxford Reference Online). Oxford University Press. Retrieved 8 December 2013
Osborne, Charles (1994), The Bel Canto Operas of Rossini, Donizetti, and Bellini, Portland, Oregon: Amadeus Press. 
Osborne, Richard (1998), "Demetrio e Polibio", in Stanley Sadie (Ed.), The New Grove Dictionary of Opera, Vol. One. London: Macmillan Publishers, Inc.   

Other sources
Osborne, Richard (1990), Rossini, Ithaca, New York: Northeastern University Press. 
Osborne, Richard (2008), Demetrio e Polibio , Grove Music Online,  Retrieved on 21 March 2008

External links
Libretto, Deutsche Rossini Gesellschaft. Accessed 23 March 2008.
manuscript copy from the Biblioteca del Conservatorio di Musica San Pietro  Majella, IMSLP.

Operas
1812 operas
Operas by Gioachino Rossini
Italian-language operas
Operas set in the Middle East